Martin Francis Kent (born 23 November 1953) is a former Australian cricketer who played in three Test matches and five One Day Internationals in 1981.

Career
Kent was a middle-order right-handed batsman. He scored 140 on his debut for Queensland in 1974–75 season followed by 76 in a Gillette Cup game. He found the going harder throughout the rest of the season, although he did manage 58 against Western Australia  and 59 against South Australia.

The following summer he scored 103 against South Australia and 101 against Victoria.

South Africa
Kent had frequently batted with Greg Chappell and received an offer to tour South Africa with an invitational XI, the International Wanderers. This side featured players like the Chappell brothers and Dennis Lillee – Kent was the only member of the side who had not played international cricket. Kent married just before he left and honeymooned on the tour.

Kent played well with scores of 55, 67 & 52 and 155. He ended up topping the International Wanderers aggregate and averages for the tour – 398 runs at 56.

Kent would have been on selectors minds at the beginning of the 1976–77 season but was unable to break through, despite 122 against the touring Pakistanis and 82 against South Australia. He was leapt over in the pecking order by Craig Serjeant, Kim Hughes and David Hookes, all of whom were chosen for the 1977 Ashes tour.

World Series Cricket
Opportunity did arise when Kerry Packer bought up most of the leading stars in 1977, but he chose World Series Cricket instead of staying with the traditional game. Ian Chappell had admired Kent's batting on the South Africa tour and offered him a place with the WSC squad.

Kent's best innings for the WSC Australians include 40 in a low scoring game, 58 and 110. This earned him selection in the second supertest but he failed twice. He had better luck in the third supertest, with knocks of 43 and 40 helping Australia win the game. In the 5th supertest he scored a pair.

The following summer Kent toured with the WSC Cavaliers XI. He endured a poor run of form until he scored 114 against the World XI and 55. He eventually got back in the Australian XI for some one day games with a top score of 62. He was back in the test side for the last supertest but failed twice.

Kent toured the West Indies with the Australian XI. He played in the supertests, making 9 & 30 in the first, then hitting 109 in a one-day game for Australia.  For the second supertest he made 78, the third 7 and 45, 51 & 28, and 40 & 0.

Return to traditional cricket
Kent had a patchy 1979–80, not making a first class century, but enjoyed an excellent domestic 1980–81 season, scoring 941 runs at 58.81. Highlights included 77, 171 and 68 against Tasmania and 78 and 101 against South Australia.

His knock of 41 in the McDonald's Cup Final, helping Queensland win the game, won him Man of the Match Award.

Kent was selected in the Australian one day team towards the end of the summer, making scores of 12, 33 and 4.

1981 Ashes
Kent was chosen to tour England in 1981. Greg Chappell elected not to tour and Kim Hughes thought at the beginning that Kent was the most likely candidate to replace him at number three. However he failed during the early games and a score of 91 by Trevor Chappell saw him come into contention for the spot. Eventually Chappell was selected, with Kent relegated to 12th man.

Kent was 12th man in the famous third test, which England won. He eventually hit form with 92 against Worcestershire (his previous high score had been 27). This earned him selection in the 4th test over Chappell, who was made 12th man.

Kent turned out to be one of Australia's best performing batsmen in the second half of the tour, with a consistent string of scores. He made 171 runs, including a fifty as a  makeshift opener at the Oval.

He made 46 and 10 in the 4th test, 52 and 2 in the fifth and 54 and 7 in the 6th.

End of career
Kent began the 1981–82 season well with 92 for Qld against the touring Pakistan side. He was selected in the Australian team for the first test against Pakistan in 1981–82 over Graham Yallop and Dirk Wellham. A serious back injury cost him his place however, forcing him to withdraw. He withdrew from cricket for the season then in August 1982 retired altogether.

In 64 first-class matches he scored a total of 3567 runs at 36.03 with a best of 171 against Tasmania. He was a fine slip catcher, taking 60 catches in all.

References

External links

1953 births
Living people
Australia Test cricketers
Australia One Day International cricketers
Queensland cricketers
World Series Cricket players
Australian cricketers
People from Far North Queensland
Cricketers from Queensland